Ernest Rhodes (6 October 1888 – 1957) was an English professional footballer who played in the Southern League and the Football League for Crystal Palace as a left back.

Personal life 
Rhodes' brother Dusty was also a footballer.

Honours 
Crystal Palace

 Football League Third Division: 1920–21

References 

English Football League players
Association football fullbacks
People from South Bank, Redcar and Cleveland
Sunderland A.F.C. players
Gravesend United F.C. players
Crystal Palace F.C. players
Sheppey United F.C. players
Southern Football League players
English footballers
1888 births
1957 deaths